"Faithful and discreet slave" is the term used by Jehovah's Witnesses to describe the group's Governing Body in its role of directing doctrines and teachings. The group is described as a "class" of "anointed" Christians that operates under the direct control of Jesus Christ to exercise teaching authority in all matters pertaining to doctrine and articles of faith.

The concept is a central doctrine of Jehovah's Witnesses' system of belief and is based on their interpretation of the Parable of the Faithful Servant at Matthew , Mark  and Luke .

The doctrine has undergone several major changes since it was formulated in 1881 by Charles Taze Russell, founder of the Bible Student movement.

Role
Watch Tower Society publications teach that Jesus uses the faithful and discreet slave "to publish information on the fulfillment of Bible prophecies and to give timely direction on the application of Bible principles in daily life" as the only means of communicating God's messages to humans. It is referred to as God's "prophet" and "channel", and claims to provide "divine" direction and guidance. Jehovah's Witnesses are told their survival of Armageddon depends in part on their obedience to the slave class.

Governing Body members are said to act in the role of the faithful and discreet slave class when arriving at decisions on doctrines, activities and oversight of Jehovah's Witnesses worldwide, including making appointments to positions of responsibility.

Origin and history

The parable on which Jehovah's Witnesses base their doctrine of the "faithful and discreet slave", as rendered in the King James Version, reads: "Who then is a faithful and wise servant, whom his lord hath made ruler over his household, to give them meat in due season? Blessed is that servant, whom his lord when he cometh shall find so doing. Verily I say unto you, That he shall make him ruler over all his goods."

Watch Tower publications assert that Christ, the "master" in the parable, returned in Kingdom power in 1914 and at that date identified those associated with the Watch Tower Bible and Tract Society as the only group still faithfully feeding his followers. Earlier publications apply different dates to this event. The date of Christ's inspection has previously been identified as 1919, though publications have also suggested Russell's group passed God's test of fitness 40 years earlier, using The Watchtower as his principal method of spreading Bible truth from 1879. Publications had claimed the slave class began using the Watch Tower Society as its legal instrument in 1884. 

Christ, in fulfillment of the parable, subsequently appointed anointed Christians associated with the Watch Tower Society "over all his belongings". The "belongings" are said to include Jehovah's Witnesses' world headquarters, branch offices, Kingdom Halls and Assembly Halls worldwide as well as the "great crowd" of Jehovah's Witnesses.

Development of doctrine
In 1881, an article in Zion's Watch Tower and Herald of Christ's Presence by the magazine's editor Charles Taze Russell identified the "faithful and wise servant" as "that 'little flock' of consecrated servants who are faithfully carrying out their consecration vows—the body of Christ ... the whole body individually and collectively, giving the meat in due season to the household of faith—the great company of believers."

In 1895, Russell's wife Maria claimed that Russell himself was the figure referred to in the parable at Matthew 24:45-47, though Russell initially declined to accept the personal application of the title, suggesting that it should apply to the Watch Tower rather than its editor. In 1897 Russell agreed that Christ would have made a "choice of one channel for dispensing the meat in due season [emphasis in the original]" and while he did not refer to that "one channel" as an individual, Russell did apply to it the personal pronoun "he" (for example: "if unfaithful he will be deposed entirely"), and noted "whoever the Lord will so use, as a truth-distributing agent, will be very humble and unassuming" and "he would not think of claiming authorship or ownership of the truth."

In 1909, in an unsigned article, the Watch Tower mentioned that the "application to us of Matthew 24:45" had come "some fourteen years ago", or about 1895. The article went on to say "the Society's literature was the channel through which the Lord sent them practically all that they know about the Bible and the Divine purposes." [emphasis added]

The prevailing view among Bible Students that Russell was "the faithful and wise servant" of Jesus' parable, was reiterated in the Watch Tower a few weeks after Russell's death in 1916:

The Watch Tower Society's official history of Jehovah's Witnesses states that Russell "did not personally promote the idea, but he did acknowledge the apparent reasonableness of the arguments of those who favored it."

In 1917, the publisher's preface to the book, The Finished Mystery, issued as a posthumous publication of Russell's writings, identified him as the "faithful and wise servant" appointed by Christ; as late as 1923, the Watch Tower repeated the same belief about his role, declaring: "We believe that all who are now rejoicing in present truth will concede that Brother Russell faithfully filled the office of special servant of the Lord; and that he was made ruler over all the Lord's goods ... Brother Russell occupied the office of that 'faithful and wise servant'."

In 1927, Watch Tower Society president Joseph Rutherford reverted to Russell's original viewpoint, announcing that the "servant" was not an individual, but was made up of the entire body of faithful spirit-anointed Christians.
 
A 1950 issue of The Watchtower appeared to assign to the "mother organization"—in reference to the Watch Tower Society—the task of feeding Christians "meat in due season"; in 1951 the magazine defined the "faithful and discreet slave" as a class of people whose teachings were imparted through a theocratic organization.

From 2000 the Governing Body was increasingly described as the representative and "spokesman" for God's "faithful and discreet slave class".

Watch Tower Society publications had taught that the "faithful and discreet slave" class had had a continuous uninterrupted existence since being appointed by Christ at the time of Pentecost AD 33, when the first 120 people upon whom holy spirit was poured out began "feeding" Jews with spiritual food. As new disciples came in, they filled the role of "domestics" and joined in feeding others. The Apostles and other early Christian disciples who wrote the books of the New Testament were also part of the "slave" class providing spiritual food to Christians.

The Watchtower claimed members of the "slave" class were a close-knit body of Christians rather than isolated, independent individuals, and that one generation of the "slave" class fed the succeeding generation to maintain the unbroken line for more than 1900 years, providing the same spiritual food to Christians worldwide. Watch Tower publications did not identify the groups filling the role of the "slave" class between the close of the Apostolic Age and the early 20th century, suggesting it disappeared from "clear view", but they implied they might have included the Lollards and the Waldensians (the latter movement described by The Watchtower as "faithful witnesses of Jehovah ... who sought to revive true worship of Christianity").

A series of talks at the 128th annual meeting of the Watch Tower Society in New Jersey on 6 October 2012 made further changes to the doctrine about the identity of the "slave". The society's report on the meeting said that "the faithful and discreet slave was appointed over Jesus' domestics in 1919. That slave is the small, composite group of anointed brothers serving at world headquarters during Christ's presence who are directly involved in preparing and dispensing spiritual food. When this group work together as the Governing Body, they act as 'the faithful and discreet slave.'" The report said the slave "logically" must have appeared after Christ's presence began in 1914.
By 2010, about 11,000 Witnesses worldwide claimed to be of the anointed slave class. 

In 2012 the society modified the doctrine, stating that the slave was now understood to be synonymous with the Governing Body, a small group of anointed elders serving at the denomination's world headquarters. The announcement also marked a change in belief about the timing of the slave class's appointment by Christ: it was said to have taken place in 1919 rather than in apostolic times, as previously believed. The doctrinal change also redefined the "domestics" of the parable—previously identified as individual "anointed" Witnesses—as all Jehovah's Witnesses. By 2022, more than 21,000 Witnesses claimed to be "anointed".

Criticism
Following his expulsion from the organization in 1981, former Governing Body member Raymond Franz claimed the description of the slave in the parable as a "class" of Christians was unsupported by scripture and was used to emphasize the concept of the slave being connected to an organization, diminishing its application to individuals in encouraging the qualities of faith, discretion, watchfulness and individual responsibility. He argued that if the application of figures in Jesus' corresponding parables as members of a class were consistent, there would also be a "ten-mina class" and "five-mina class" relating to Luke 19:12–27 and a "many strokes class" and "few strokes class" arising from Luke 12: 47–48.

Franz claimed the leadership employs its interpretation of the "faithful and discreet slave" parable primarily to support the concept of centralized administrative authority in order to exercise control over members of the group by demanding their loyalty and submission. He said the "anointed" remnant, which at that time was claimed to comprise the "slave" class, had negligible input into Watch Tower Society doctrine and direction, which were set by the Governing Body.

Franz also argued that the Watch Tower Society and its doctrines were built on the independent Bible study of its founder, Charles Taze Russell, who neither consulted any existing "faithful and discreet slave" class for enlightenment, nor believed in the concept taught by the Society. He concluded: "In its efforts to deny that Jesus Christ is now dealing, or would ever deal, with individuals apart from an organization, a unique 'channel', the teaching produces an untenable position. It claims that Christ did precisely that in dealing with Russell as an individual apart from any organization." Franz also claimed that Jehovah's Witnesses' official history book, Jehovah's Witnesses—Proclaimers of God's Kingdom, misrepresented Russell's view of the "faithful steward" by emphasizing his initial 1881 view that it was the entire body of Christ, without mentioning that he altered his view 14 years later.

See also
Jehovah's Witnesses beliefs
Eschatology of Jehovah's Witnesses
Organizational structure of Jehovah's Witnesses
New World Translation of the Holy Scriptures
144,000

References

Beliefs and practices of Jehovah's Witnesses
Organizational structure of Jehovah's Witnesses